District 9 is a district in the Swiss city of Zürich.

The district comprises the quarters Albisrieden and Altstetten. Both entities were formerly municipalities of their own, but were incorporated into Zürich in 1934.

References

9